Tiamzón is a Hispanized Hokkien-language surname.

Notable people
Benito Tiamzon (born 1951), Filipino leftist political organizer
Ernestine Tiamzon (born 1997), Filipino-Canadian volleyball athlete
Nicole Tiamzon (born 1995), Filipino volleyball player
Wilma Tiamzon (born 1952), Filipino leftist political organizer

See also
Timson (disambiguation) 

Hokkien-language surnames